Brian Jordan Davis (born January 28, 1953) is a United States district judge of the United States District Court for the Middle District of Florida.

Biography

Davis received his Bachelor of Arts degree in 1974 from Princeton University. He received his Juris Doctor from 1980 from the Fredric G. Levin College of Law at the University of Florida. He worked as an attorney at Mahoney, Hadlow & Adams, P.A. from 1980 to 1982 and at Brown, Terrell, Hogan, Ellis, McClamma & Yegelwel from 1988 to 1991. He worked as an Assistant State Attorney from 1982 to 1988. He served as Chief Assistant State Attorney in the Fourth Judicial Circuit from 1991 to 1994. He served as a Circuit Judge for the Fourth Judicial Circuit of Florida from 1994 to 2013.

Federal judicial service

On February 29, 2012, President Barack Obama nominated Davis to serve as a United States District Judge on the United States District Court for the Middle District of Florida. He would replace Judge Richard A. Lazzara, who assumed senior status on December 17, 2011. The Senate Judiciary Committee reported Davis' nomination to the full Senate on June 21, 2012 by a 10–7 vote. Although Davis' nomination has enjoyed the support of his two home-state senators, several other senators, including Senator Chuck Grassley opposed his nomination, based largely on a speech that Davis gave to his local NAACP chapter in 1995. Grassley had charged that Davis' answers to certain questions suggested a bias in favor of African-Americans and a lack of impartiality. On January 2, 2013, Davis' nomination was returned to the President, due to the sine die adjournment of the Senate. On January 3, 2013, he was renominated to the same office.  Davis' nomination was reported out of committee on October 31, 2013 by a 16–2 vote. On December 16, 2013, Senate Majority Leader Harry Reid filed for cloture on Davis' nomination, in an attempt to end a Republican-led filibuster on Davis' nomination. On December 20, 2013, the United States Senate invoked cloture on his nomination by a 56–36 Senate vote. That same day, his nomination was confirmed by a 68–26 vote.  He received his commission on December 26, 2013.

See also 
 List of African-American federal judges
 List of African-American jurists

References

External links

1953 births
Living people
African-American judges
Florida state court judges
Judges of the United States District Court for the Middle District of Florida
Princeton University alumni
United States district court judges appointed by Barack Obama
Fredric G. Levin College of Law alumni
21st-century American judges
State attorneys
20th-century American lawyers